is a 2015 Japanese comedy drama film directed by Hajime Hashimoto. It was released on April 25, 2015.

Cast
Yutaka Mizutani
Rena Tanaka
Kazue Fukiishi
Hiroyuki Onoue
Munetaka Aoki
Tomoya Nakamura
Yumi Adachi

Reception
The film earned  on its opening weekend in Japan.

References

External links
 

2015 comedy-drama films
Japanese comedy-drama films
Films directed by Hajime Hashimoto
2010s Japanese films

ja:王妃の館#映画